Auroch Digital is a game development company based in Bristol, UK. It previously ran the GameTheNews initiative, a project that produced news games on a variety of topics, for which it was included in the 2014 Nominet 100 list of companies doing social good with technology. In September 2021, Auroch Digital was acquired by Sumo Group for $8.3 million.

Overview 
The company makes video games and tabletop games, with its main focus on strategy and management titles, and adaptations of board games into digital games, having worked with companies such as Games Workshop, Steve Jackson Games, and Modiphius Entertainment.

On 1 June 2022, it was announced a first person shooter based on the Warhammer 40k franchise was in development titled Warhammer 40,000: Boltgun and to be published by Focus Entertainment.

Games developed

References

External links 
 Official website

Sumo Group
Video game development companies
Video game companies of the United Kingdom
Companies based in Bristol
2021 mergers and acquisitions